George Blumenthal may refer to:
George Blumenthal (astrophysicist) (born 1945), American astrophysicist and chancellor of the University of California, Santa Cruz
George Blumenthal (banker) (1858–1941), head of the US branch of Lazard
George Blumenthal, co-founder in 1993 of International CableTel, the precursor to Virgin Media

See also
George Blumenthal House, New York City